Boneless meat is meat that is not bone-in, i.e. does not have the bone attached. In general boneless cuts, while not as flavorful as those cooked bone-in, will cook faster and do not require eating around or carving around the bone.

Chicken
Boneless chicken typically does not have a skin, as this is removed during the process of removing the bones. For this reason, it is sometimes considered healthier. A downside is that the skin may help prevent the chicken from drying during cooking, so that it can have more moisture and flavor.

Boneless chicken breast
An upside of boneless and skinless chicken breast is that it is versatile and easy to handle.

Boneless chicken wings
Boneless chicken wings are not actually wings, but rather are typically formed from breast meat, which is faster to cook but not as succulent as real wings, which have skin, bone, and cartilage. Part of producers' incentive to make boneless chicken wings is that wholesale chicken breast can be cheaper.

Pork 
Typically a boneless pork chop is a deboned rib or loin chop.

Lamb 
Boneless roast of lamb will not be as flavorful as one roasted bone-in, but it will cook faster and doesn't require skill to carve around the bone.

References

Meat
Cooking